Phnom Samkos Wildlife Sanctuary is a wildlife sanctuary in western Cambodia, bordering Thailand. It is also designated as an Important Bird Area (IBA).

Phnom Samkos Wildlife Sanctuary is located in the Cardamom Mountains and the area comprises mostly forested mountains, but with many different habitats and forest-types, and the landscape is dominated by three discrete peaks: Phnom Samkos ( and Cambodia's second highest peak), Phnom Khmaoch, and Phnom Tumpor.

History 
Historically, the sanctuary area has been inhabited by ethnic Por (or Pear), the namesake of the broader term Pearic people. In Cambodia, ethnic groups living in the highlands of the country are all referred to as Khmer Loeu.

Flora and fauna 
The sanctuary is notable for its large diversity of habitats, including several types of forests. The interior of the sanctuary is largely unexplored by scientists, but small-scale surveys suggests that many rare, unique and even endemic species are present. There is a rich diversity of primates and monkeys.

Threats 
The sanctuary has been under threat from illegal logging, including specific targeting of Cinnamomum parthenoxylon trees for use in the illegal drug market. Another threat is illegal hunting of wildlife.

See also
List of protected areas of Cambodia

References

External 
 Phnom Samkos Wildlife Sanctuary
 Wildlife and Livelihoods in the Cardamom Mountains, Cambodia
 Sustainable financing of protected areas in Cambodia: Phnom Aural and Phnom Samkos wildlife sanctuaries
 
 Map of Protected areas system in Cambodia

Wildlife sanctuaries of Cambodia
Protected areas of Cambodia
Geography of Pursat province
Protected areas established in 1994
Cardamom Mountains